Alex Hartley can refer to:

 Alex Hartley (artist) (born 1963), British artist
 Alex Hartley (cricketer) (born 1993), English cricketer